Mystery Range is a 1937 American Western film starring Tom Tyler. It is one of a number of films Tyler made for producer Sam Katzman.

Cast
Tom Tyler as Tom Wade 
Jerry Bergh as Jennifer Travis 
Milburn Morante as Jim 
Jim Correy as One of Morgan's men 
Dick Alexander as Lupe Bardes

References

External links
Mystery Range at IMDb
Mystery Range at TCMDB

1937 films
American Western (genre) films
1937 Western (genre) films
American black-and-white films
1930s American films